Nevada Badmen is a 1951 American Western film directed by Lewis D. Collins and written by Joseph O'Donnell. The film stars Whip Wilson, Fuzzy Knight, Jim Bannon, I. Stanford Jolley, Phyllis Coates and Marshall Reed. The film was released on May 27, 1951, by Monogram Pictures.

Plot

Cast          
Whip Wilson as Whip Wilson
Fuzzy Knight as Texas
Jim Bannon as Jim Bannon
I. Stanford Jolley as Old Man Waller 
Phyllis Coates as Carol Bannon
Marshall Reed as Mert Larkin 
Riley Hill as Jess Waller 
Lee Roberts as Clint
Pierce Lyden as Sheriff Connelly
Bill Kennedy as Jensen 
Stanley Price as Deputy Ed
Bud Osborne as Charlie

References

External links
 

1951 films
1950s English-language films
American Western (genre) films
1951 Western (genre) films
Monogram Pictures films
Films directed by Lewis D. Collins
American black-and-white films
1950s American films